Stade Hamuta is a multi-use stadium in Papeete, Tahiti, in French Polynesia.  It is currently used mostly for football matches and hosts the home matches of AS Manu-Ura of the Tahiti Division Fédérale.  The stadium holds 10,000 spectators.

External links
Stadium information

Football venues in French Polynesia
Rugby union stadiums in French Polynesia
Papeete
Sport in Tahiti